Özden is a Turkish surname. Notable people with the surname include:

 Cevher Özden (1933–2008), Turkish banker
 Yekta Güngör Özden (born 1932), Turkish judge, and former president of the Constitutional Court of Turkey
 Özden Öngün (born 1978), Turkish football goalkeeper

Turkish-language surnames
Turkish masculine given names